Petr Schwarz (born 12 November 1991) is a Czech professional footballer who plays as a midfielder for Śląsk Wrocław and the Czech Republic national team. Besides the Czech Republic, he has played in Poland.

Honours
Raków Częstochowa
Polish Cup: 2020–21

References

1991 births
Living people
People from Náchod
Sportspeople from the Hradec Králové Region
Czech footballers
Association football midfielders
FC Hradec Králové players
Raków Częstochowa players
Śląsk Wrocław players
Ekstraklasa players
I liga players
Czech Republic international footballers
Czech expatriate footballers
Expatriate footballers in Poland
Czech expatriate sportspeople in Poland